, also known by  and his Chinese style name , was a member of the royal family of the Ryukyu Kingdom who served as sessei, a post often translated as "prime minister", from 1654 to 1666.

Gushikawa Chōei was the seventh son of Kin Chōkō and Shuriōkimi Aji-ganashi. He was also a half-brother of King Shō Hō. After Shō Shitsu succeeded the throne, he led a mission Edo in 1649.

Gushikawa Chōei was also the author of Ishinagu nu uta, a ryūka poem/song known for its striking thematic similarity to Kimigayo, the national anthem of Japan.

References

People of the Ryukyu Kingdom
1610 births
Year of death unknown
Princes of Ryūkyū
17th-century Ryukyuan people
Sessei